Avinash Mukherjee (born 1 August 1997) is an Indian television actor. Mulherjee is best known for his portrayal of Young Jagdish Singh in Balika Vadhu. He also played Ranbir Khanna in Itna Karo Na Mujhe Pyaar and Soham Singh in Shakti. Mukherjee is currently seen as Aarav Oswal in the TV series Sasural Simar Ka 2.

Filmography

Television

Web series

Awards

References

External links
 

Living people
Indian television male child actors
Indian male television actors
21st-century Indian male actors
1997 births